{{DISPLAYTITLE:C27H36O3}}
The molecular formula C27H36O3 may refer to:

 Orestrate
 Quingestanol acetate